The Apple TV app (also known as Apple TV, TV, and the TV app) is a line of media player software programs developed by Apple Inc. for viewing television shows and films delivered by Apple to consumer electronic devices. It can stream content from the iTunes Store, the Apple TV Channels a la carte video on demand service, and the Apple TV+ original content subscription service. On iPhones, iPads, iPod Touches, and Apple TVs it can also index and access content from linked apps of other video on demand services.

The app was released in the United States in December 2016 for iOS and tvOS Apple devices and was rolled out to other countries starting in late 2017. During the course of 2019 and 2020, it was brought to Mac and the third generation Apple TV and gradually, with certain feature omissions, to non-Apple devices: post-2015 Roku and Amazon Fire TV models and some newer television models on the Roku TV, Fire TV Edition, Samsung Tizen, LG webOS, and Vizio SmartCast smart TV platforms, with select new Sony Android TV models gaining access in October 2020.

Content from the TV app may also be streamed via Apple's AirPlay 2 protocol from a device supporting the TV app to particular smart television sets from Sony, Vizio, LG, and Samsung.

Platforms

iOS and tvOS versions

TV was announced at an Apple media event on October 27, 2016, and was released in the United States on December 12, 2016, with iOS 10.2 and tvOS 10.1, replacing the "Videos" application in earlier versions of iOS. It aggregates television shows and movies from the iTunes Store with content from installed partner apps, and can track progress across devices using the same Apple ID. Only content from Apple's services opens inside the TV app; other content is opened in the linked app.

The app originally contained five sections: "Watch Now", "Sports", "Library", "Store" and "Search". Push notifications for sports scores can be enabled.

TV received a major redesign following Apple's March 2019 media event, which refocused it as a hub for Apple-distributed video streaming. The new version added support for Apple TV Channels and debuted a new icon similar to the Apple TV hardware icon, replacing the previous icon resembling a television.

TV was added to the pre-tvOS 3rd generation Apple TV in March 2019, though this version lacks the ability to link with other video on demand apps. Picture-in-picture and switching between multiple Apple IDs was added in tvOS 13 to fourth generation and newer Apple TVs.

TV supports 4K, Dolby Atmos, Dolby Vision, and HDR10 on the Apple TV 4K. Dolby Vision and HDR10 are supported on iPad Pro and iPhone models released in 2017 or later, and Dolby Atmos on 2018 iPad Pro models and iPhones.

macOS version
TV was released with macOS Catalina on October 7, 2019, as one of three applications created to replace iTunes. It supports Dolby Atmos, Dolby Vision, and HDR10 on MacBooks released in 2018 or later, while 4K HDR playback is supported on the iMac Pro and other Macs released in 2018 or later when connected to a compatible display.

Non-Apple devices

Apple announced in January 2019 that the TV app would be made available on non-Apple platforms for the first time. The decision to expand to other platforms was cited as part Apple's efforts to expand its service revenues by making video content available widely to the public.

It launched on Roku on October 15, 2019, on models with a 3800 model number or higher, and on the Roku TV platform. It became available on Amazon Fire TV on October 24, 2019, though limited to Fire TV devices released in 2016 or later, and on the Fire TV Edition platform.

The app launched on Samsung TVs on their customized version of the Tizen OS platform on May 13, 2019. It became available on the LG webOS platform on February 3, 2020. It was added to the Vizio SmartCast platform on September 8, 2020.

The app also launched on select 2020 Sony Bravia Android TV models on October 14, 2020. On December 16, 2020, Google announced that the Android TV version of the app would be widely made available to other devices running Android TV, beginning with the Chromecast with Google TV in early 2021. It became available on nearly all Android TV models and devices running on Android TV 8.0 on June 1, 2021.

The app became available on the PlayStation 4 and PlayStation 5 in November 2020, as well as the Xbox One, and the Xbox Series X/S on November 10, 2020.

The features available through the software on non-Apple devices are more limited than those on Apple devices, such as a lack of Dolby Atmos and Dolby Vision support, but additional updates have lessened the differences over time.

Content sources

Apple TV+

TV is the portal for Apple's Apple TV+ service, featuring original content created for Apple.

MLS Season Pass 

On June 14, 2022, Major League Soccer announced that it had signed a 10-year broadcasting deal with Apple that would take effect with the 2023 MLS season, under which Apple would hold the global over-the-top streaming rights to all MLS and Leagues Cup matches, and selected MLS Next and MLS Next Pro matches. The service, known as MLS Season Pass, launched on February 1, 2023 as a channel in the Apple TV app. In addition to offering a discounted rate to Apple TV+ subscribers, a package of MLS and Leagues Cup matches is available for Apple TV+ subscribers, with a subset of these matches available for free.

Apple TV Channels
Apple TV Channels is a service that aggregates content from popular video on demand a la carte subscription services and is accessed from the TV app. Announced in March 2019, it is designed to simplify subscriptions by making them purchasable and accessible in one video content hub, so the consumer need not use each service's own sign-up mechanism or view the content through each service's own app or website. It is designed to compete with similar services such as Amazon Channels and Hulu Add-Ons, which similarly make multiple subscription premium networks available in one location. The payment method can also be centralized through Apple's own billing service. Because the content is from paid subscription services, it will be ad-free. Content can also be downloaded to the device for offline viewing, and there is an option to share accounts within families.

Partners include Cinemax, Boomerang, Discovery Channel, Motor Trend, Tastemade, Starz, MGM+, Showtime, BET+, Paramount+, Nick+, Noggin, Curiosity Stream, Mubi, Globoplay, BBC Select, BritBox, AMC+, Allblk, Shudder, and Acorn TV. HBO was a launch partner but deprecated their channel following the launch of HBO Max, discontinuing new subscriptions and retaining existing ones for Apple users who registered for the channel before the May 2020 launch of HBO Max (while granting access to HBO Max at no extra charge) until July 22, 2021, when it was discontinued for existing subscriptions. The broad reach of the 1.4 billion Apple devices in use globally induced major services, some of which already have their own content distribution systems, to make deals with Apple.

Netflix declined to be involved with the service, with CEO Reed Hastings saying that they chose not to integrate its service's programming into Apple TV Channels because "we prefer to have our customers watch our content in our service." Netflix would have received little or no data about viewers from Apple TV Channels. AT&T CEO Randall Stephenson, during an on-stage discussion with CNBC's Andrew Ross Sorkin at a fintech event, pushed back on the suggestion that content providers like AT&T's HBO would "not have the same level of access to the data" captured from Apple TV Channels that they currently receive through their own apps and websites to "see what everybody's really watching and be able to make certain decisions", instead insisting that AT&T's digital distribution deals provide it "access to data ... critical to advertising delivery, [ ] critical to marketing".

iTunes Store

TV can stream content rented or purchased from the iTunes Store.

Linked video on demand apps
The versions of the TV app on iOS, iPadOS, and tvOS can integrate and curate content from supported video on demand apps installed on the same device, and can track progress across devices using the same Apple ID. Only content from Apple's services opens inside the TV app, for other content it will open the linked app. Support from apps varies by country. Support for Netflix is limited; their television shows and films will appear in search results and play, but other features like curation and progress tracking are unavailable.

Release history

References

Notes

External links

Official page for the Apple TV app at apple.com

IOS software
Video on demand services
Apple Inc. software
TvOS software
IOS
IOS-based software made by Apple Inc.